The 23S rRNA is a 2,904 nucleotide long (in E. coli) component of the large subunit (50S) of the bacterial/archean ribosome and makes up the peptidyl transferase center (PTC). The 23S rRNA is divided into six secondary structural domains titled I-VI, with the corresponding 5S rRNA being considered domain VII. The ribosomal peptidyl transferase activity resides in domain V of this rRNA, which is also the most common binding site for antibiotics that inhibit translation, making it a target for ribosomal engineering. A well-known member of this antibiotic class, chloramphenicol, acts by inhibiting peptide bond formation, with recent 3D-structural studies showing two different binding sites depending on the species of ribosome. Numerous mutations in domains of the 23S rRNA with Peptidyl transferase activity have resulted in antibiotic resistance.  23S rRNA genes typically have higher sequence variations, including insertions and/or deletions, compared to other rRNAs.

The eukaryotic homolog of the 23S LSU rRNA is the 28S ribosomal RNA, with a region filled by the 5.8S ribosomal RNA.

23S rRNA Functions 
In general, rRNA has an essential function of peptidyl transferase. The stimulating core of the ribosome plays role in the peptide bond configuration. Both peptidyl-tRNA and aminoacyl-tRNA are important for protein synthesis and transpeptidation response.

Essential Bases 
However, 23S rRNA positions (G2252, A2451, U2506, and U2585) have a significant function for tRNA binding in the P site of the large ribosomal subunit. These modification nucleotides in site P can inhibit peptidyl-tRNA from binding. U2555 modification can also intervene with transferring peptidyl-tRNA to puromycin. Furthermore, the chemical modification of half of these positions G2251, G2253, A2439, and U2584 can not prevent the tRNA binding. Peptidyl-tRNA of 50S subunits which binds to the P site preserve eight positions of 23S rRNA from chemical modification. On the other hand, mutation in 23S rRNA can also have impacts on cell growth. Mutations A1912G, A1919G and Ψ1917C have a powerful growth phenotypes and they prevent translation while mutation A1916G has a simple growth phenotype and it leads to defect in the 50S subunits.

23S rRNA Helix 26a 
The 23S ribosomal RNA is composed of six domains forming a complex network of molecular interactions. A central single-stranded region connects all of the domains through base-pairing of the two halves, forming Helix 26a. Some consider Helix 26a to be Domain 0 due to its action as a central core and compact folding unit. Comparison of 23S and 28S ribosomal RNA sequences across species demonstrate conservation of Helix 26a. Helices continue to provide the support as the backbone of domain architecture.

Plastid 
Chloroplast ribosomes from "higher" plants have an additional 4.5S rRNA created by fragmentation of 23S. It is located to the 3' side of 23S in the rRNA operon and corresponds to the 3' end of non-fragmented 23S rRNA.

See also 
23S methyl RNA motif
 LSU rRNA

References

External links 
 
 Pseudobase entry for pseudoknot of the 23S ribosomal RNA (PKB00148)

Ribosomal RNA